Andel Exit (also called as Angel Exit) is a 2000 Czech drama movie directed by Vladimír Michálek with Jan Cechticky and Klára Issová. The movie was based on the 1995 novel of Jáchym Topol named Anděl. The movie earned two Czech Lion Awards in 2000 for Best Design and Best Editing.

The movie vividly depicts the former atmosphere and architecture around Anděl in the 1990s, before the progressive renovation of the neighbourhood. The efforts came to fruition in the early 2000s with the construction of Zlatý Anděl, a multi-purpose office and business development, followed by a shopping centre an many more new businesses.

Synopsis
The film is about Mike, an addict and a thief, who decided to get away from drugs after falling for his new neighbour Jane. However his girlfriend Kaja keeps an influence on him and convinces him to cook one last batch. Following the tricks of Kaja, Mike ends up in South Africa where he gets involved with local gangsters and meth dealers.

Cast

Jan Čechtický as Mikes
Klára Issová as Kája
Zuzana Stivínová as Jana
Vojtěch Pavlíček as Lukás
Pavel Landovský as Machata
Eva Holubová as Machatová
Věra Galatíková as Head Nurse
Martin Sitta as Cinca
Jan Kehár as Pikna
Lucie Váchová as Kája
Markéta Tanner as Stepa
Žofie Hradilková as Nada
Pavel Zajíček as Luria
Martin Telvák as Guinea pig

Production
After being impressed by the novel of Jáchym Topol named Anděl, director Vladimír Michálek met with him and asked Topol to accompany with him in the screenplay. The film commenced its shooting on December 24, 1999.

Reception
The movie was met with positive reviews. CER said that despite having an infantile plot, the film worked best on the microscopic level by picking up the minutiae of modern life and capturing the ills of a generation on screen. Film Blitz also noted that the film provide an eye-opening picture of a rarely-seen side of Prague: life in ageing decrepit appartement blocks near the metro station Anděl near the centre of the city, of peddled religious icons and groceries bought on credit, where meaningless sex and drugs are used as an escape by the main characters.

Awards 
Czech Lion Awards , 2000
 Won, Best Design  - Vladimír Michálek and Martin Strba 
 Won, Best Editing - Jiří Brožek 
 Nominated, Best Actress - Klára Issová
 Nominated, Best Actress in a Supporting Role - Zuzana Stivínová 
 Nominated, Best Director - Vladimír Michálek 
 Nominated, Best Cinematography - Martin Strba 
 Nominated, Best Sound - Radim Hladík Jr.

Trivia
 The movie was shot entirely digitally using a skeleton crew and then transferred onto 35mm film
 Klára Issová shaved her head completely bald (on screen) for the movie.

References

External links

http://www.sms.cz/film/andel-exit
http://m.kinema.sk/recenzia/3378/andel-exit-andel-exit.htm

2000 films
Czech drama films
Czech Lion Awards winners (films)